The Filoil EcoOil Centre, formerly Filoil Flying V Centre, Filoil Flying V Arena and The Arena in San Juan, also known as the Entertainment and Recreational Arena of the People (initials taken after former mayor and president Joseph Estrada's nickname 'Erap'), is an indoor sporting arena located along Bonny Serrano Avenue, Barangay Corazon de Jesus, San Juan, Metro Manila, Philippines.

The Centre played host to the basketball games of the Philippine Basketball Association, the National Collegiate Athletic Association, the University Athletic Association of the Philippines since 2009, the Filoil Flying V Preseason Cup, Philippine Collegiate Champions League, Maharlika Pilipinas Basketball League, Filbasket, Pilipinas Super League, as well as the Premier Volleyball League. It is also the secondary home court of Alab Pilipinas in the ASEAN Basketball League. It is also known as the "Volleyball Central" of the Philippines, as the Centre served as the main venue for volleyball tournaments such as UAAP, NCAA, Philippine Super Liga and Premier Volleyball League. The Centre was also used as a main venue for the San Juan Mayor's Cup, a basketball and volleyball tournament for the San Juan government employees.

Filoil Flying V entered in a naming rights agreement with the San Juan city government, changing the arena's name into "Filoil Flying V Arena" (renamed into Filoil Flying V Centre in 2016). It was the first such agreement in the Philippines since the San Andres Gym in Malate, Manila lent naming rights to FedEx's sister company Mail And More in 2000. Currently, it is one of two sporting venues in the Philippines to named after an external naming rights partner, the other being the Smart Araneta Coliseum.

In 2015, the San Juan government signed a 15-year deal with Homegrown Olympic Management Enterprises (Filoil EcoOil Sports), the organizer of the Filoil EcoOil Preseason Cup that which be helmed the day-by-day operations and management of the centre. Among the HOME's plans is to convert the Centre into a complete events venue and add a new structure for restaurants and business establishments.

In July 2022, the venue was renamed as the Filoil EcoOil Center. The venue's new logo was unveiled at the start of the 15th FilOil EcoOil Preseason Cup.

Gallery

References

External links
 City of San Juan official website
 Arena in San Juan

Sports venues in Metro Manila
Indoor arenas in the Philippines
ASEAN Basketball League venues
Basketball venues in the Philippines
Volleyball venues in the Philippines
Buildings and structures in San Juan, Metro Manila